Darya Kenar (also Romanized as Daryā Kenār; also known as Daryā Kenār-e Soflá) is a village in Gel-e Sefid Rural District, in the Central District of Langarud County, Gilan Province, Iran. At the 2006 census, its population was 1,021, in 347 families.

References 

Populated places in Langarud County